Grazay is a village and commune in the Mayenne département of north-western France.

See also
Communes of the Mayenne department

References

Communes of Mayenne